Dialin (1,2-dihydronaphthalene) is a hydrocarbon with the chemical formula C10H10. It is similar to naphthalene but one ring is partially saturated.

See also 
 Naphthalene
 Tetralin
 Decalin

Hydrocarbons